The Mönchsjoch Hut (German: Mönchsjochhütte) is a mountain hut located in the Bernese Alps in the canton of Valais in Switzerland.

The hut lies just above the Obers Mönchsjoch (3,627 m), between Mönch and Trugberg, on the upper Aletsch Glacier. It is used for the ascents of Jungfrau, Mönch and other peaks of the region.

Access 
The hut is easily accessible by pedestrians from the Jungfraujoch railway station during the summer season by a secured piste on the glacier. However, during winter season it remains accessible only to mountaineers. It can also be accessed from the Konkordia Hut on the south.

See also
List of buildings and structures above 3000 m in Switzerland

External links 

 
Mönchsjochhütte hike description and map

Mountain huts in Switzerland
Mountain huts in the Alps